Kallithea (before 1981: Καλλιθεόκαμπος - Kallitheokampos) is a community in the suburbs of Patras in Achaea, Greece. It is located 9 km south of downtown Patras, on the Greek National Road 33 to Tripoli. The community consists of the villages Kallithea and Ano Kallithea, and is part of the municipal unit Messatida within the municipality of Patras. The nearest villages are Ovrya to the north and Thea to the west. To the east lies the mountain Omplos.

Population

See also
List of settlements in Achaea
Sidirokastro (Achaea)

References

Messatida
Populated places in Achaea